József Sátori (25 February 1926 – 23 February 2014) was a Hungarian rower. He competed at the 1948 Summer Olympics, the 1952 Summer Olympics and the 1960 Summer Olympics. Along with his family, he helped to hide Jewish people from the Nazis during World War II.

References

1926 births
2014 deaths
Hungarian male rowers
Olympic rowers of Hungary
Rowers at the 1948 Summer Olympics
Rowers at the 1952 Summer Olympics
Rowers at the 1960 Summer Olympics
Rowers from Budapest